Intervention mapping is a protocol for developing theory-based and evidence-based health promotion programs. Intervention Mapping describes the process of health promotion program planning in six steps:

 the needs assessment based on the PRECEDE-PROCEED model
 the definition of performance and change objectives based upon scientific analyses of health problems and problem causing factors;
 the selection of theory-based intervention methods and practical applications to change (determinants of) health-related behavior;
 the production of program components, design and production;
 the anticipation of program adoption, implementation and sustainability; and
 the anticipation of process and effect evaluation.

Intervention mapping is characterized by three perspectives: an ecological approach, participation of all stakeholders, and the use of theories and evidence. Although intervention mapping is presented as a series of steps, the authors see the planning process as iterative rather than linear. Program planners move back and forth between tasks and steps. The process is also cumulative: each step is based on previous steps, and inattention to a particular step may lead to mistakes and inadequate decisions.

Brief history and purpose of the protocol 
Intervention mapping was first developed and introduced in 1998 by L. Kay Bartholomew, Guy S. Parcel & Gerjo Kok, with an article in Health Education & Behavior. In 2001 the first edition of the book followed, with Nell H. Gottlieb as 4th author. In 2006, the 2nd edition was published, and in 2011, the 3rd edition, with Maria E. Fernández as 5th author. The 4th edition appeared in 2016, authored by L. Kay Bartholomew Eldridge, Christine M. Markham, Robert A.C. Ruiter, Maria Fernández, Gerjo Kok & Guy S. Parcel. This was the last edition led by L. Kay Bartholomew Eldridge, who died in February 2016.

Intervention mapping was developed as a reaction to a lack of comprehensive frameworks for health promotion program development. Intervention mapping aims to help health promoters develop the best possible intervention. The key words in this protocol are planning, research, and theory. Intervention mapping provides a vocabulary for intervention planning, procedures for planning activities, and technical assistance with identifying theory-based determinants and methods for change. Intervention mapping can also help in adapting existing interventions to new populations and settings, and provides a taxonomy of behavior change methods that can be used to code intervention content. In the health promotion field, intervention mapping has successfully been applied in various settings, to a wide range of different behaviors and populations. It may help planners develop theory- and evidence-based interventions to promote healthy behavior.

More specifically, intervention mapping ensures that theoretical models and empirical evidence guide planners in two areas: (1) the identification of behavioral and environmental determinants related to a target problem, and (2) the selection of the most appropriate theoretical methods and practical applications to address the identified determinants. Intervention mapping has been described as complex and elaborate.
However, this is crucial to bring the development of interventions to a higher level, indicating that advantages outweighed disadvantages. Intervention mapping is developed in the health promotion field but can easily be applied in other fields, such as promoting energy conservation.

Steps and tasks 
 Step 1: Logic Model of the Problem
 Establish and work with a planning group
 Conduct a needs assessment to create a logic model of the problem
 Describe the context for the intervention including the population, setting, and community
 State program goals
 Step 2: Program Outcomes and Objectives – Logic Model of Change
 State expected outcomes for behavior and environment
 Specify performance objectives for behavioral and environmental outcomes
 Select determinants for behavioral and environmental outcomes
 Construct matrices of change objectives
 Create a logic model of change
 Step 3: Program Design
 Generate program themes, components, scope, and sequence
 Choose theory- and evidence-based change methods
 Select or design practical applications to deliver change methods
 Step 4: Program Production
 Refine program structure and organization
 Prepare plans for program materials
 Draft messages, materials, and protocols
 Pretest, refine, and produce materials
 Step 5: Program Implementation Plan
 Identify potential program users (implementers, adopters, and maintainers)
 State outcomes and performance objectives for program use
 Construct matrices of change objectives for program use
 Design implementation interventions Implementation
 Step 6: Evaluation Plan
 Write effect and process evaluation questions
 Develop indicators and measures for assessment
 Specify the evaluation design
 Complete the evaluation plan

See also 
 Behavior change (public health)
 Behavioural change theories
 Health psychology

References and bibliography

Further reading 
 Koutoukidis, D.A., Lopes, S., Atkins, H., Croker, H., Knobf, M.T., Lanceley, A. & Beeken, R.J., (2018). Use of intervention mapping to adapt a health behavior change intervention for endometrial cancer survivors: the shape-up following cancer treatment program. BMC Public Health, 18:415. 
 Schaalma, H. & Kok, G. (2011). Case study 3: A school HIV-prevention program in the Netherlands. Case study on the companion site for Bartholomew et al. (2011).  Bartholomew Eldredge, Parcel, Kok, Gottlieb, Fernandez: Planning Health Promotion Programs: An Intervention Mapping Approach, 3rd Edition - Student Companion Site
 Bartholomew, L. K., & Mullen, P. D. (2011). Five roles for using theory and evidence in the design and testing of behavior change interventions. Journal of Public Health Dentistry, 71, S20–S33. 
 Abraham, C., Kok, G., Schaalma, H.P. & Luszczynska, A. (2011). Health promotion. In: P.R. Martin, F.M. Cheung, M.C. Knowles, M. Kyrios, L. Littlefield, J.B. Overmier & J.M. Pieto (Eds.), IAAP handbook of applied psychology (pp. 81–111.). Oxford, UK: Wiley Blackwell.
 Leerlooijer, J.N., Ruiter, R.A.C., Reinders, J., Darwisyah, W., Kok, G. & Bartholomew, L.K. (2011). The World Starts With Me: using Intervention Mapping for the systematic adaptation and transfer of school-based sexuality education from Uganda to Indonesia. Translational Behavioral Medicine, 1, 331–340. 
 Vereecken, C., Huybrechts, I., van Houte, H., Martens, V., Wittebroodt, I. & Maes, L. (2009). Results from a dietary intervention study in preschools "Beastly Healthy at School". International  Journal of Public Health, 54, 142–149. 
 Kok, G., Gottlieb, N.H., Commers. M. & Smerecnik, C. (2008). The ecological approach in health promotion programs; A decade later. American Journal of Health Promotion, 22, 437-442.
 Godin, G., Gagnon, H., Alary, M., Levy, J.J. & Otis, J. (2007). The degree of planning: an indicator of the potential success of health education programs. Promotion & Education, XIV (3), 138-142.
 Tortolero, S. R., Markham, C. M., Parcel, G. S., Peters, R. J. Jr., Escobar-Chaves, S. L., Basen-Engquist, K., et al. (2005). Using Intervention Mapping to adapt an effective HIV, sexually transmitted disease, and pregnancy prevention program for high-risk minority youth. Health Promotion Practice, 6, 286–298. 
 Fernández, M. E., Gonzales, A., Tortolero-Luna, G., Partida, S., & Bartholomew, L. K. (2005). Using Intervention Mapping to develop a breast and cervical cancer screening program for Hispanic farmworkers: Cultivando La Salud. Health Promotion Practice, 6, 394–404. 
 Kok, G., van Essen, G.A., Wicker, S., Llupià, A., Mena, G., Correia, R. & Ruiter, R.A.C., (2011). Planning for influenza vaccination in health care workers: an Intervention Mapping approach. Vaccine, 29, 8512–8519.

External links 
 Intervention Mapping

Health promotion